Erich Schmidt-Leichner (14 October 1910 – 17 March 1983) was a German lawyer who made a name as a distinguished defense counsel at the Nuremberg trials (1945 – 1946), as assistant counsel in the Flick Trial and the IG Farben Trial, as well as main counsel in the Ministries Trial.

He distinguished himself again as defense counsel in the 1950 - 1951 Frankfurt homosexual trials. In the early 1960s, he represented Werner Heyde, a chief accused in Aktion T4, the involuntary euthanasia program in Nazi Germany. Starting in October 1966, he represented Franz Six who had been found guilty in the 1947 - 1948 Einsatzgruppen Trial, and was being reinvestigated for crimes committed by the Reichssicherheitshauptamt (RSHA).

In 1978, in the Klingenberg Case, which attracted international attention, he was defense counsel for the parents of Anneliese Michel, a German woman who underwent 67 Catholic exorcism rites during the year before her death. A court found that she had died of malnutrition and medical neglect, for which her parents and two priests were found guilty and convicted of negligent homicide.

References 
 
 Erich Schmidt-Leichner, Unrechtsbewusstsein und Irrtum in ihrer Bedeutung für den Vorsatz im Strafrecht, Breslau-Neukirch, 1935.
 Festschrift Für Erich Schmidt-Leichner Zum 65. Geburtstag, ed. Rainer Hamm, Walter Matzke et al. 1977.

External links 
 

Nuremberg trials
Exorcism in Christianity
1910 births
1983 deaths
Legal history of Germany
20th-century German lawyers